Billiards and snooker in the 27th Southeast Asian Games took place at Wunna Theikdi Billiard & Snooker Indoor Stadium in Naypyidaw, Myanmar between December 13–20.

Medal summary

Men

Women

Mixed

Results

Men's

9 ball pool singles

10 ball pool singles

Women's

9 ball pool singles

10 ball pool singles

Mixed

Carom 1 cushion singles

English billiard singles

English billiard doubles

English scotch billiard doubles

English billiard teams

Snooker singles

6 red snooker singles

Snooker doubles

Medal table

References

2013 Southeast Asian Games events
Cue sports at the Southeast Asian Games
Cue sports in Myanmar